A matte display is an electronic display with a matte surface. Matte displays feature a light-scattering antireflection layer, which reduces reflectivity at the cost of decreased contrast and color intensity under dimly lit conditions. If the steep nanostructures are used – etched in the surface – a matte display can achieve an effect that is similar to continuous refraction index reduction. 

The image quality in displays with matte finish is not as sharp or bright as a glossy screen but is easier to color-match and calibrate with a printer.

See also
 Anti-reflective coating
 Glossy display
 Nanotextured surface

References

Further references
 CIE No38-1977: Radiometric and photometric characteristics of materials and their measurement
 CIE No 44-1979: Absolute methods for reflection measurements
 CIE No17.4-1987: International lighting vocabulary, 4th ed. (Joint publication IEC/CIE)
 John C. Stover, Optical Scattering, Measurement and Analysis, SPIE Press, 1995

External links 

 I work for an LCD manufacturer : Insightful slashdotter on the mathematical significance of screen specs.

Display technology
Vision
Ergonomics